Ben Rhys Thompson (born 3 October 1995) is an English professional footballer who plays as a midfielder for EFL League One club Peterborough United.

Early life
Thompson was born in Sidcup, south-east London.

Career

Millwall 
He made his senior debut for Millwall on 26 August 2014, as a 76th-minute substitute for Jimmy Abdou in a 0–2 home defeat to Southampton in the second round of the League Cup. He was also an unused substitute for the final two games of the 2014–15 Championship season, which ended in relegation to League One. Thompson scored his first Millwall goal against League Two side Wycombe Wanderers, scoring from an excellent effort 25 yards outside the box in a 1–2 FA Cup loss.

On 17 August 2018, Thompson joined EFL League One club Portsmouth on a season-long loan. Ben Thompson was recalled on 6 January 2019 back to his parent club Millwall.

With his playing time limited to just 5 appearances in the 2021–22 season on 31 January 2022 it was announced by Millwall that Thompson had cancelled his contract by mutual consent.

Gillingham 
He immediately joined up with his former Millwall manager, Neil Harris, at EFL League One club Gillingham, signing a short term contract until the end of the 2021–22 season. He made his debut for the Kent side in a 1–0 away league loss to Ipswich Town on 5 February 2022. Following the club's relegation at the end of the 2021–22 season, Thompson left the club.

Peterborough United 
On 14 June 2022, Thompson signed for League One club Peterborough United on a two-year contract with an option for a third year. He scored his first goal for Peterborough in a 3-0 win against Morecambe

Style of play
Thompson has been described by Neil Harris, who has managed him at Millwall and Gillingham, as a player with "ball carrying ability, tenaciousness and aggression".

Career statistics

Honours
Millwall
EFL League One play-offs: 2017
Individual

 Football League Young Player of the Month: April 2016

References

External links

1995 births
Living people
Footballers from Sidcup
English footballers
Association football midfielders
Millwall F.C. players
Portsmouth F.C. players
Gillingham F.C. players
Peterborough United F.C. players
English Football League players